Dubok may refer to:

 Dobok, Korean martial arts uniform.
 Dubok (camouflage), a camouflage pattern used (formerly) by the USSR and some Post-Soviet states.